The following is a list of awards and nominations received by American director, producer, and screenwriter Quentin Tarantino. In 1994, for his work on Pulp Fiction, he was nominated for the Academy Award for Best Director and for Best Original Screenplay, winning the latter. While Pulp Fiction was nominated for Best Picture, Tarantino wasn't a listed producer. He was nominated for the same categories in 2009 for Inglourious Basterds, and in 2012 he again won Best Original Screenplay for Django Unchained. He received his first Best Picture nomination for Once Upon a Time in Hollywood due to his producer’s credit.

Awards and nominations

AACTA International Awards

Academy Awards

Best Picture

Best Director

Best Original Screenplay

BAFTA Awards

Best Film

Best Director

Best Original Screenplay

BAFTA Britannia Awards

Cannes Film Festival

Critics' Choice Movie Awards

Golden Globe Awards

Best Motion Picture – Musical or Comedy

Best Director

Best Screenplay

Film Independent Spirit Awards

National Board of Review Awards

Best Film

Best Director

Best Original Screenplay

National Society of Film Critics Awards

Best Film

Best Director

Best Screenplay

Sitges Film Festival

Saturn Awards

Best Action, Adventure or Thriller Film

Best Horror Film

Best Thriller Film

Best Fantasy Film

Best Supporting Actor

Best Director

Best Writing

Primetime Emmy Awards

Grammy Awards

Golden Raspberry Awards

Stinkers Bad Movie Awards

Directed Academy Award performances

Other lifetime honors
 2005 Icon of the Decade Award at the 10th Empire Awards.
 2007 Lifetime achievement award at the Malacañan Palace in Manila.
 2008 Filmmaker on the Edge Award at the Provincetown International Film Festival.
 2010 Order of Merit of the Hungarian Republic along with Lucy Liu and Andy Vajna for producing the 2006 film Freedom's Fury.
 2011 honorary César from the Académie des Arts et Techniques du Cinéma.
 2013 Lifetime Achievement Award by the Rome Film Festival.
 2013 Prix Lumière, at the fifth Festival Lumière, in Lyon, France.

References 

Awards and nominations received by
Tarantino, Quentin, list of awards and nominations received by
Tarantino, Quentin, list of awards and nominations received by